Badger's Green is a 1934 British comedy film directed by Adrian Brunel and starring Valerie Hobson, Bruce Lester, David Horne and Wally Patch. It was adapted from the 1930 play Badger's Green by R.C. Sheriff. A picturesque village is threatened with redevelopment by a speculative builder, leading to widespread protest. In the end the builder agrees to settle the future of the village on the result of a cricket match.

It was produced by the British & Dominions Film Corporation at their Elstree Studios as a quota quickie for distribution by Paramount Pictures to allow them to comply with the terms of the annual quota. Badger's Green is currently missing from the BFI National Archive, and is listed as one of the British Film Institute's "75 Most Wanted" lost films. The story was later remade for the 1949 film Badger's Green, which does survive.

Cast
 Valerie Hobson as Molly Butler
 Bruce Lester as Dickie Wetherby
 David Horne as Major Forrester
 Sebastian Smith as Mr Twigg
 John Turnbull as Thomas Butler
 Wally Patch as Mr Rogers
 Elsie Irving as Mrs Wetherby

References

Bibliography
 Chibnall, Steve. Quota Quickies: The Birth of the British 'B' Film. British Film Institute, 2007.
 Low, Rachael. Filmmaking in 1930s Britain. George Allen & Unwin, 1985.
 Wood, Linda. British Films, 1927-1939. British Film Institute, 1986.

External links
 

1934 films
Films directed by Adrian Brunel
British films based on plays
1934 comedy films
British comedy films
Films set in England
Lost British films
British black-and-white films
British and Dominions Studios films
Films shot at Imperial Studios, Elstree
1934 lost films
Lost comedy films
1930s English-language films
1930s British films
Quota quickies
Paramount Pictures films